Mark DeBolla (born 1 January 1983) is an English football forward who is currently unattached after being released in the summer of 2008 from AFC Wimbledon. He has previously played for Charlton Athletic, Chesterfield, Notts County, Grays Athletic and Gravesend & Northfleet. At Notts County he scored his first and only goal for the club on his debut against Torquay United.

He is of Italian and French ancestry.

Towards the end of the 2007-08 season he was loaned out to Bromley. He returned to AFC Wimbledon after the end of Bromley's season to score the winner in the Isthmian Premier play-off final against Staines Town.

DeBolla began the 2008–09 season playing for Isthmian League Division One South club Croydon Athletic. He then joined Sittingbourne in February 2009.

References 

 

1983 births
Living people
English footballers
English people of Italian descent
English people of French descent
National League (English football) players
English Football League players
Isthmian League players
Charlton Athletic F.C. players
Chesterfield F.C. players
Notts County F.C. players
Grays Athletic F.C. players
Ebbsfleet United F.C. players
Sittingbourne F.C. players
AFC Wimbledon players
Footballers from Camberwell
Croydon Athletic F.C. players
Association football forwards